Khudsiani is a surname used by Fereydani Georgians from Iran. It is related to the Caucasian Georgian surname Khutsishvili, "which may be derived from Khutsesi (priest) and mean son of a priest". Notable people with the surname include:

 Karim Khudsiani, Iranian Georgian Screenwriter, Television presenter and actor

References

Persian-language surnames